Rockingham General Hospital is a public hospital in Rockingham, Western Australia, in the south west of the Perth Metropolitan Region.  The  hospital was originally known as Rockingham Kwinana District Hospital, but was renamed in 2008 during a major redevelopment.  The 229-bed hospital has an emergency department, operating theatres, and medical, surgical and paediatric wards. There are also aged care rehabilitation, intensive care, mental health, chemotherapy, and obstetrics units.

History

A 64-bed hospital was proposed for the Kwinana and Rockingham areas in 1954, following population growth due to the development of the Kwinana Refinery.

A major redevelopment to upgrade the district hospital to a larger general hospital began in June 2007. The first phase was the construction of a new building, completed in October 2008; the second phase involved renovating the existing building. A significant portion of the second phase was completed by September 2009, and the project was completed in September 2010 with the opening of new chemotherapy and maternity units.

References

Hospital buildings completed in 2008
Hospitals in Perth, Western Australia
City of Rockingham